Raymond Jeener (1904–1995) was a Belgian molecular biologist and professor at the Universite Libre de Bruxelles (ULB). In 1954, he was awarded the Francqui Prize on Biological and Medical Sciences.

References

Academic staff of the Université libre de Bruxelles
Belgian molecular biologists
1904 births
1995 deaths